Nikolaos Ventouras (Greek: Νικόλας Βεντούρας; August 31, 1899 – April 1, 1990) was a Greek artist and engraver.

Summary
Nikolaos Ventouras was born the 31st of August 1899, in a noble family of the region of Venice, Veneto, which was included in the Libro d'Oro. The family settled on the island of Corfu around 1730. Members of the family defended the island in the Siege of Corfu (1716). In fact one of his ancestors was the writer Isabella Teotochi Albrizzi and Ioannis Kapodistrias, who was his great uncle. He had one brother, married 2 times, had a daughter from his second marriage and a grandson. He studied chemistry but became one of the greatest engravers of the 20th century. He did not study further, but since he was familiar with a number of languages, he acquired his own, deep education, particularly around issues of art and philosophy.

It has been written about him "if etching had not been discovered, surely he would have discovered it".

Nikos Ventouras passed on April 1, 1990.

The first years

As he notes on his resume, drafted in 1981, "already from the early classes of elementary school, I was taught sketching".

In 1916 he took a 2-year class to study chemistry in Athens at the Academy of Commerce and Industry, but never worked as a chemist. Although he had no academic studies on art, his devotion and persistence guided him in his work.

Nikolas Ventouras was a passionate photographer and never missed a chance to capture 'life' with his Rolleiflex. It is noteworthy that some of his photos were chosen by the National Geographic. He also loved traveling, motorcycles and bicycles. In 1923, from March 16 to May 5 he travelled from Brindisi to Vienna with a group of cyclists.

Art-History

It can be agreed that the starting point of his artistic career were the watercolour lessons he received from Angello Giallina, from 1931 to 1937.

He started printmaking, specifically engraving in wood, etching on copper and stone (a relatively new technique, invented by the German Alois Senefelder), as early as 1932, feeling reluctant in respect to his tutor. But engraving won him over and he focused his interest in perfecting it. In his résumé he notes "self-taught excluding lithography which I was taught". He took some lithography (etching on stone) courses in 1937. Primarily the evolution of the engraving was personal and he evolved several variations of known techniques.

His complete work consists of dry-point, vernis mou, aquarelle, oil, wood etching, copper etching, lithography, lithography on zinc, printing fabric, photogravure, monotypes and custom prints for Ex Libris, books, magazines, stamps, greeting cards etc.

The study of chemistry and the study of bees helped him experiment with materials and corrosion times, which helped him achieve the exact level of detail he intended.

Due to his persistence and his evolution in the area of etching he is considered a pioneer of printmaking.

Art-Style

He draws his inspiration mainly from the local tradition of Corfu focusing his on themes of the city life in the Corfu town, rural landscapes and the ships, using the human form only in complementary roles. Other thematic sections, but to a lesser extent, can be identified as his landscapes, the famous Constellations, impressive processions, religious performances and his completely abstract compositions. Color was used to accentuate his feeling and therefore it is not uncommon to find variations of his works with color. Furthermore, he uses the visual styles of the European era with equivalent expressionist, surrealist and cubist elements, which are reflected in his works.

With seemingly fast lines that give a capacity in his works, he manages to give an abstract character which differentiates them from conventional standards of his time. This brings etching side by side with the modernist tendencies of Greek art. His works reveal a modernist approach, especially for his time, as the building blocks of visual configurations released by the initial visual stimuli and simultaneously incorporate his personal expression. He uses an expressionist idiom, but not distinguished for its brutality in a more poetic character.

Nikolaos Ventouras was the only Greek artist who served printmaking with such dedication, persistence and consistency for over half a century and has maintained throughout his work a morphoplastic idiom.

He was very meticulous keeping detailed notes for each work and excellent organization of the workshop, tools, apprenticeship. In the file kept detailed notes, the emotion that he intended to capture, the time of taking a task and when finished, the technique used and materials. Noted that perhaps the same project after a long time or even several years, noting the progress of each project and its progress. The raw materials were thoroughly registered. Especially for paper, he noted weight, type, date and origin and how that affects the result of "printing". The colors were always clean and he made himself the blend of colours and chemical compounds in order to achieve the desired result.

The perfection and meticulousness that characterized him allowed Nikolao Ventoura to print the same project in different sizes with exactly the same detail. He also figured out a way to print the etchings without pressure marks and even upside down. He was very strict with his work and made notes -in the judgment of quality performance in his own metric ranging from "kachektypon" (misprint) all they through to "exeretikon" (perfect).

With these efforts left behind an innovative project rich in expression and meaningful content.

Influences

From his first works until 1937, Nikolas Ventouras, carves landscapes. His work is calm and filled with light; his subjects come from Corfu and Venice.

During the years of the Second World War and immediately after the war, 1945–1948, he floods his projects with inspiration and expression drawn from post-war ruins, disasters and perspective distortions. His work clearly reveals his psychological state influenced by the historical events. This period can be identified as expressionistic.

1949 to 1950 shows his diversity; few lines, strictly calculated expressing serenity and tranquility, his works are again full of light.

1955 is the year Piraeus changes the scene for Ventouras. He introduces plurality in intercepting forms which, in time, are simplified. He uses, smokestacks, winches and cranes whatever is necessary in the background to complement the harbour, and show how live it is. His lines and some “drops” of color complete his works.

Mr. Manolis Hatzidakis in a 1963 speech given at the "Athens Technological Institute" notes: [...] By simplifying things, we would say that we feel to exhale from the work of Mr Ventoura a new lyrical sense of the world ernment so disciplined to laws purely disciplinary. People, landscapes and people, transformed into works of art by a lyrical fantasy goes beyond appearances and things and which found expression within too simple: the search for the essential, and the rejection of unnecessary lent the works of Mr. Ventoura a cleaner spiritual quality. [...]

His work

In 1928 he illustrated an ethography of Constantine Theotoki "The Life and Death of Karavela", using India ink. The illustration was bought by Vassileiou's publishing house and the relevant printing plates were created. Before these are printed, Mr. Vassileiou passes, and the project stops. Finally, in 1961 his son issued the book with a small number of the drawings as they could not find all of the printing plates.

The prints carry the nickname N. G. Viros (as per Ventouras’ request)

He worked and was friends with other major Greek artists such as Nikos Hadjikyriakos-Ghikas, Alamanos Spyros and Eleni Vakalo.

He first presented his work in Athens, at the 1948 Panhellenic Art Exhibition in Athens and continued to exhibit his work every year until 1969. Nikolaos Ventouras has participated in individual, group and international exhibitions in Greece and abroad. It is noteworthy to mention that he also participated at the Biennale of São Paulo (1955,1957), the Alexandria Biennale (1957), the Venice Biennale (1964).

In 1982, four of his prints were added to the British Museum department of Prints and Drawings with the famous Easter procession from the church of St Nicholas being one among them, along his personal favourites, The bend in the road.

His first solo exhibition was presented in 1963 at the Athens Institute of Technology. A retrospective exhibition of his work was held a year after his death, in 1991 in Athens. Art Gallery Hyacinth. On May 29, 2016, the “Municipal Art Gallery” in Corfu opens its doors to a retrospective exhibition, in memory of "Nikolaos, Ada and Fanny Ventoura”, and is titled “Persistently Modern”.

The largest retrospective exhibition to date was curated by his grandson and presented at the Piraeus Annex of the Benaki Museum in 2017. It featured over 500 original works of art as well as notes, sketches and studies. It took over 4 years of preparatory work to present this large body of work and was accompanied by a book with a foreword by Martin Royalton-Kisch, until 2009 Senior Curator in the Department of Prints and Drawings of The British Museum.

Although he experimented and printed in all kinds of surfaces, it was etching on copper plates that won him over.

Collections
National Gallery
Alpha Bank
Municipal Gallery of Corfu 
Heracles GCCo 
British Museum Department of Prints and Drawings
Museum of Modern Greek Art (Art Gallery)
University of Oregon
Benaki Museum (Nikos Hadjikyriakos-Ghika Gallery)

Exhibitions

Personal exhibitions
 1963, Athens technological Institute, Athens
 1981, Gallery Zygos, Athens
 1986, Yakinthos gallery
 1991, Yakinthos gallery
 2016, Municipal Gallery of Corfu
 2016, Instituto Italiano di Cultura, Athens
 2017, Benaki Museum

Group exhibitions
 1947, "Grekish Konst", Kunglica Akademia foer de Fria Konsterna, Stockholm, Sweden
 1948, "1st΄ Panhellenic Artistic Exhibition", Zappeion Megaron, Athens, Greece
 1952, "4th΄ Panhellenic Artistic Exhibition", Zappeion Megaron, Athens, Greece
 1955, "III Bienal de Sao Paulo", São Paulo Museum of Art, São Paulo, Brazil
 1955, "La Grece vivante", Geneva, Switzerland
 1957, "Exhibition of Greek Artists", T.I.F. (Thessaloniki International Fair), Thessaloniki, Greece
 1957, "IV Bienal de Sao Paulo", São Paulo, Brazil
 1957, "5th΄ Panhellenic Artistic Exhibition", Zappeion Megaron, Athens, Greece
 1957, "2nd΄ Mediterranean Artistic Exhibition", Alexandria, Egypt
 1957, "Biennale Tokyo 1957", Tokyo, Japan
 1958, "Artistic Group Exhibition "The Workshop", Zygos Art Gallery, Athens, Greece
 1959, "Artistic Group Exhibition "The Workshop", Exhibit Hall of the American Central Intelligence Agency, Athens, Greece
 1960, "Group Exhibition", Nees Morfes Art Gallery, Athens, Greece
 1960, "Painting-Sculpture-Engraving-Decorating", Nees Morfes Art Gallery, Athens, Greece
 1960, "6th΄ Panhellenic Artistic Exhibition", Zappeion Megaron, Athens, Greece
 1961, "5th΄ Artistic Group Exhibition "The Workshop", Parnassos Literary Society, Athens, Greece
 1961, "IV International Biennale of Graphic Art 1961", Museum of Modern Art, Ljubljana, Slovenia
 1963, "8th΄ Panhellenic Artistic Exhibition", Zappeion Megaron, Athens, Greece
 1963, "Hellenic Art Exhibition", Belgrade, Serbia
 1963, "Artistic Group Exhibition "The Workshop": 6th Exhibition, Parnassos Literary Society, Athens, Greece
 1963, "International Engraving Exhibition", Tokyo, Japan
 1964, "32 Biennale di Venezia 1964", Venice, Italy 
 1965, "8th΄ Panhellenic Exhibition", Zappeion Megaron, Athens, Greece
 1967, "9th΄ Panhellenic Artistic Exhibition", Zappeion Megaron, Athens, Greece
 1969, "Expozitia de Arta Plastica Contemporana din Grecia", Ateneul Roman, Bucuresti, Romania
 1969, "10th΄ Panhellenic Artistic Exhibition of Painting, Sculpting, Engraving, Decorating", Zappeion Megaron, Athens, Greece
 1969, "8th Artistic Group Exhibition "The Workshop, Athens Hilton Art Hall, Athens, Greece
 1971, "Tribute to Greek Engraving, 1972 Calendar", Nees Morfes Art Gallery, Athens, Greece
 1971, "11th Panhellenic Artistic Exhibition", Zappeion Megaron, Athens, Greece
 1976, "Panorama of Greek Art 1950–1975", National Art Gallery–Alexandros Soutzos Museum, Athens, Greece
 1977, "Greek Engraving", Nees Morfes Art Gallery, Athens, Greece
 1977, "Balkan Exhibition of Friendship", National Art Gallery–Alexandros Soutzos Museum, Athens, Greece
 1977, "Painting and Engraving of Balkan Countries", Museu de Arts, Bucuresti, Romania
 1978, "Zeitgenoessische Griechische Malerei und Graphik", Institut fuer Auslandsbeziehungen, Stuttgart, Germany
 1978, "Modern Greek Artists and Engravers", Hellenic Cultural Center, Nicosia, Cyprus
 1978, "Engraving Exhibition ", Drama, Greece
 1980, "18 Greek Engravers", Yakinthos Art Gallery, Kifisia, Athens, Greece
 1981, "Modern Greek Engraving and Efthymis Papadimitriou", Yakinthos Art Gallery, Kifisia, Athens, Greece
 1981, "National Bank go Greece Art Collection", National Art Gallery–Alexandros Soutzos Museum, Athens, Greece
 1983, "Morphoplastic and Technical Research in Greek Engraving 1892–1982", Rhodes Municipal Gallery, Rhodes
 1985, "Greek Engravers: Rhodes Municipal Gallery Collection", Municipal Art Gallery of Larissa G.I. Katsigras Museum, Larissa, Greece
 1985, "Memories-Transformations-Searches", National Art Gallery–Alexandros Soutzos Museum, Athens, Greece
 1985, "Greek Engravers", Athenaeum Art Gallery, Athens, Greece
 1986, "Summer Lounge", Yakinthos Art Gallery, Kifisia, Athens, Greece
 1986, "Gravure Exhibition of Greek Artists: Tribute to Goya", Instituto Cervantes Atenas, Athens, Greece
 1987, "Panhellenic Artistic Exhibition 1987", Piraeus Port Authority Exhibition Centre, Piraeus, Greece
 1987, "Summer Lounge ΄87", Yakinthos Art Gallery, Kifisia, Athens, Greece
 1988, "Greek Engraving", Thessaloniki Municipal Gallery, Thessaloniki, Greece
 1988, "Greek Modern Art: Account of a Collection 1975–1987", National Art Gallery–Alexandros Soutzos Museum, Athens, Greece
 1988, "Greek Postwar Engraving", National Art Gallery–Alexandros Soutzos Museum, Athens, Greece
 1988, "Group Exhibition", Yakinthos Art Gallery, Kifisia, Athens, Greece
 1988, "Β΄ Panionia Visual Arts Exhibition", Corfu Municipal Gallery, Corfu, Greece
 1989, "Ionian Painters from the 18th to the 20th century", Yakinthos Art Gallery, Kifisia, Athens, Greece
 1990, "Greek Engravers ", Municipal Gallery of Patras, Patras, Greece
 1991, "Summer Lounge ΄91", Yakinthos Art Gallery, Kifisia, Athens, Greece
 1992, "Modern Transformations: The Greek Experience", National Art Gallery–Alexandros Soutzos Museum, Athens, Greece
 1992, "Artistic proposals", Yakinthos Art Gallery, Kifisia, Athens, Greece
 1992, "Greek engraving: Section D", Aetopouleio Cultural Center - Library, Chalandri, Athens, Greece
 1993, "Artistic proposals", Yakinthos Art Gallery, Kifisia, Athens, Greece
 1994, "Gravures Helleniques Contemporaines", Konschthans Beim Engel, Luxemburg
 1994, "Greek ex libris by Greek Artists", Yakinthos Art Gallery, Kifisia, Athens, Greece
 1994, "Summer Lounge ΄94", Yakinthos Art Gallery, Kifisia, Athens, Greece
 1995, "Engraving Collection of the Ionian Bank", Museum of Cycladic Art, Athens, Greece
 1995, "Contemporary Greek Engraving", Athens Municipal Gallery, Athens, Greece
 1995, "Summer Lounge ΄95", Yakinthos Art Gallery, Kifisia, Athens, Greece
 1996, "Greek Artists 1954–1996", Giorgio de Chirico Art Cultural Center, Volos, Greece
 1996, "Tribute to Orthodoxy, Section C΄: Greek Engravers Engraved Religious Issues", Yakinthos Art Gallery, Kifisia, Athens, Greece
 1996, "Summer Lounge 1996", Yakinthos Art Gallery, Kifisia, Athens, Greece
 1996, "Eleven Masters of Greek Engraving", Hellenic Foundation for Culture, London, United Kingdom
 1996, "Three Corfiot Engravers", Yakinthos Art Gallery, Kifisia, Athens, Greece
 1996, "Modern Greek Engraving", X. Leontiadi Collection, Thessaloniki Cultural Capital of Europe 1997, Greece
 1997, "22 important representatives of modern Greek engraving", Astrolavos Art Gallery, Athens, Greece
 1999, "Artistic proposals", Yakinthos Art Gallery, Kifisia, Athens, Greece
 1999, «Modern Greek Engraving – 20th Century , X. Leontiadi Collection » Ministry of Development, Athens, Greece
 2000, "Lights and Shadows-Panorama of Greek Engraving", Nicosia Municipal Cultural Centre, Nicosia, Cyprus
 2000, "Lights and Shadows-Panorama of Greek Engraving", National Art Gallery–Alexandros Soutzos Museum, Athens, Greece
 2000, "Twelve and One Teachers of Modern Greek Engraving", Grigorakis Gallery-Engraving Museum, Psychiko, Athens, Greece
 2002, "Three Corfiot Engravers: Ventouras-Zavitzianos-Kogevinas", Grigorakis Gallery-Engraving Museum, Psychiko, Athens, Greece
 2003, "Greek Sculpture-Engraving, Collections by Theodoros Hadjisavvas", Athens Municipal Gallery, Athens, Greece
 2003, "Greek Engravers in the 20th century", National Bank of Greece Cultural Foundation (Eynard Mansion), Athens, Greece
 2003, "Art Patron-Cities, Settlements and Neighborhoods in Greek Painting 19th & 20th Century", Touring Exhibit, Athens, Xanthi, Rhodes, Greece
 2003, "Greek Engravers in the Twentieth Century", Art Space 8, Rethimno, Crete
 2003, "Island landscapes and ports of Greece", Grigorakis Gallery-Engraving Museum, Psychiko, Athens, Greece
 2003, "Summer Engravers Lounge 2003 - Engraving Panorama", Grigorakis Gallery-Engraving Museum, Psychiko, Athens, Greece
 2003, "Lights and Shadows-Panorama of Greek Engraving ", Chania Municipal Gallery, Chania, Crete
 2003, "Art Patron-Cities, Settlements and Neighborhoods in Greek Painting 19th & 20th Century", Ioannina Municipal Gallery, Ioannina, Greece
 2004, "Olive Tribute", Academy of Athens, Athens, Greece
 2004, "Y. Papakonstantinou Collection", Psychiko Municipal Gallery, Psychiko, Athens, Greece
 2004, "The Ship & the Sea by Greek Engravers", Grigorakis Gallery-Engraving Museum, Psychiko, Athens, Greece
 2004, "Summer Engravers Lounge 2004 - Πανόραμα Χαρακτικής", Grigorakis Gallery-Engraving Museum, Psychiko, Athens, Greece
 2005, "Alpha Bank Collection, Painting-Engraving-Sculpture", Benaki Museum Piraeus Street Anex, Athens, Greece
 2005, "Ports of Hellenism. Greek Limenography", Contemporary Art Center of Thessaloniki, Warehouse B1-Thessaloniki Port, Thessaloniki, Greece
 2005, "The Olive Tree from Greek Engravers", Grigorakis Gallery-Engraving Museum, Psychiko, Athens, Greece
 2005, "Summer Engravers Lounge 2005 - Πανόραμα Χαρακτικής", Grigorakis Gallery-Engraving Museum, Psychiko, Athens, Greece
 2006, "Alpha Bank Collection: Greek Art from 1920 until today", MOMus-Museum of Contemporary Art, Thessaloniki, Greece
 2006, "Olive Tribute", United Nations, New York, United States of America
 2006, "Summer Engravers Lounge 2006 - Engraving Panorama", Grigorakis Gallery-Engraving Museum, Psychiko, Athens, Greece
 2006, "Pioneers and Teachers of Modern Greek Engraving", Grigorakis Gallery-Engraving Museum, Psychiko, Athens, Greece
 2007, "Olive Tribute", SPAP Olympia Conference and Exhibition Centre, Ancient Olympia, Olympia, Greece
 2007, "Summer Engravers Lounge 2007 - Engraving Panorama", Grigorakis Gallery-Engraving Museum, Psychiko, Athens, Greece
 2008, "Panorama of Greek Engraving", Technopolis (Gazi), Athens, Greece
 2008, "Summer Engravers Lounge 2008 - Engraving Panorama", Grigorakis Gallery-Engraving Museum, Psychiko, Athens, Greece
 2009, "Pioneers-Teachers and engravers of the 20th century ", Piraeus Municipal Gallery, Piraeus, Greece
 2009, "The Human Form in Art", Technopolis (Gazi), Athens, Greece
 2009, "Impressions on paper", Piraeus Municipal Gallery, Piraeus, Greece
 2009, "The modern Greek landscape from the 18th to the 21st century: Vision, experience and renovation of the space", B. & M. Theocharakis Foundation, Athens, Greece
 2009, "1st Athens Engraving Festival", Various Spaces in Athens, Greece
 2009, "100 Years of Modern Greek Engraving (1909–2009) - Y. Papakonstantinou Collection", Society for Macedonian Studies, Thessaloniki, Greece
 2009, "Greeks engraved", Ersi's Gallery, Athens, Greece
 2009, "Summer Engravers Lounge 2009 - Engraving Panorama", Grigorakis Gallery-Engraving Museum, Psychiko, Athens, Greece
 2010, "Summer Engravers Lounge 2010 - Engraving Panorama", Grigorakis Gallery-Engraving Museum, Psychiko, Athens, Greece
 2011, "Greek Painters in the Calendars of HERACLES General Cement Company 1956–2009", Benaki Museum, Athens, Greece
 2013, "Classic and modern Greek engraving 1930–1950", Modern Archives, Cholargos, Athens, Greece
 2014, "Art in Europe after 1945: Beyond Borders ", MOMus-Museum of Contemporary Art, Thessaloniki, Greece
 2014, "Modern Greek Printmaking from the Y. Papakonstantinou Collection", 12 Star Gallery, Europe House, London, United Kingdom

References 

 Home Τρίκλινον
 Municipal Gallery of Corfu 
 www.ventouras.gr
 Contemporary Greek Art Institute 

1990 deaths
1899 births
Greek people of Venetian descent
Artists from Corfu
20th-century engravers
20th-century Greek painters